Justice Mohammad Rafiq (born 25 May 1960) is an Indian Judge. He is a former Chief Justice of Himachal Pradesh High Court, Madhya Pradesh High Court, Orissa High Court and Meghalaya High Court and also a former Judge of Rajasthan High Court. Twice, he served as the Acting Chief Justice of Rajasthan High Court. He is also currently serving as the Chancellor (ex-officio) of Himachal Pradesh National Law University, Shimla.

Early life

Rafiq was born in Sujangarh of Churu district in Indian state of Rajasthan. He earned bachelor's degree from G.H.S. Govt. PG College, Sujangarh affiliated to Rajasthan University in 1980. Then, he continued to study Bachelor of Legislative Law (LLB) and received the LLB degree in 1984. He started his career as an advocate shortly after getting LLB degree. He continued to study further and got the master's degree in 1986.

Career

Rafiq started his career as a government advocate in Rajasthan on 15 July 1986 and was promoted to Deputy Government Advocate on 22 December 1987. He was appointed as Central Government Standing Counsel in1992.He was appointed Additional Advocate General of the state of Rajasthan on7th January 1999.On15th May 2006, Rafiq was appointed a Judge of Rajasthan High Court, he has also served as Acting Chief Justice of Rajasthan High Court twice.

Rafiq was appointed a Chief Justice of Meghalaya High Court on 13 November 2019. He was transferred from Meghalaya High Court to Orissa High Court as the 31st Chief Justice of Orissa High Court and took oath on 27 April 2020. He was then transferred as Chief Justice of Madhya Pradesh High Court on 31 December 2020 and took oath on 3 January 2021. He was transferred as Chief Justice of Himachal Pradesh High Court on 9 October 2021 and took oath on 14 October 2021. He retired on 24 May 2022.

References

1960 births
Living people
Chief Justices of the Orissa High Court
Judges of the Meghalaya High Court
Judges of the Rajasthan High Court
Indian judges
Rajasthani people
21st-century Indian lawyers